"I Won't See You Tonight" is a two-part song by Avenged Sevenfold. The songs appeared on their second studio album, Waking the Fallen, as tracks 9 and 10 respectively. The song charted on the overall US song sales chart in 2014.

Music
The first portion, "I Won't See You Tonight Part 1" is a power ballad, while "I Won't See You Tonight Part 2" is much faster, and more in line with the Metalcore sound the band played in their early days. The Rev's drumming on (Part 2) was reportedly inspired by the work of drummer Paul Bostaph from Slayer.

Meaning
The song is about suicide, with "Part 1" being from the point of view of the one committing, while "Part 2" is from the point of view of someone close to them.
Around August 2001, former bassist Justin Sane attempted suicide by drinking excessive amounts of cough syrup. This event was the reason for Avenged Sevenfold to join the Take Action Tour in 2003. During Sane's hospitalization, he remained in poor condition and had to leave the band. In an interview, lead singer M. Shadows said of Sane that "he perma-fried his brain and was in a mental institution for a long time, and when you have someone in your band who does that, it ruins everything that's going on all around you, and it makes you want to do something to prevent it from happening to other people."

Critical reception
In 2021, Return of Rock ranked the song(s) at number 19 on its list of the 20 greatest Avenged Sevenfold songs. It was also features on Revolver's list of the best non-hair metal power-ballads. It was described on the latter list as "the most powerful (ballad) in (the band's) repertoire."

Charts

Personnel
Credits are adapted from the album's liner notes.

Avenged Sevenfold

 M. Shadows – lead vocals
 Zacky Vengeance – guitars, backing vocals
 The Rev – drums, percussion, backing vocals
 Synyster Gates – guitars, piano, backing vocals
 Johnny Christ – bass guitar, backing vocals

Production
 Andrew Murdock – producer, mixing engineer
 Fred Archambault – co-producer
 Ai Fujisaki – assistant engineer
 Tom Baker – mastering engineer
 Mike Fasano, Bruce Jacoby, Al Pahanish – drum tech
 Stephen Ferrara – guitar tech
 Scott Gilman – orchestral arrangements and performance

References

2003 songs
Avenged Sevenfold songs
Songs about suicide